Due to the success of the C programming language and some of its derivatives, C-family programming languages span a large variety of programming paradigms, conceptual models, and run-time environments. These languages are described by notable programming sources as being C-like, being dialects of C, having C-like syntax, or otherwise being similar to C.

Such languages are likely to share some syntax and basic language constructs with C, such as semicolon-terminated statements, curly-brace-delimited code blocks, parentheses-delimited parameters, and infix-notated arithmetical and logical expressions. The use of curly brackets ({}) to denote blocks of code has led to the name curly-bracket languages being sometimes used.

References 

 
C